Friends Old and New is an album led by pianist John Hicks, recorded in 1992.

Recording and release
The album was recorded at BMG Studios in New York City on January 14, 1992. It was produced by Bob Thiele. The musicians were pianist John Hicks, trumpeters Greg Gisbert and Clark Terry, trombonist Al Grey, tenor saxophonist Joshua Redman, bassist Ron Carter, and drummer Grady Tate. "I Want to Talk About You" is a trio track.

Friends Old and New was released by Novus Records.

Reception

On Allmusic, Ron Wynn observed "pianist John Hicks playing in various combo settings with some excellent musical associates ... for some powerhouse numbers".

Track listing
 "Hicks Tone" (John Hicks) – 7:52
 "I Want to Talk About You" (Billy Eckstine) – 5:56
 "Bop Scotch" (Glenn Osser, Bob Thiele) – 4:58
 "True Blue" (Osser, Thiele) – 6:34
 "It Don't Mean a Thing (If It Ain't Got That Swing)" (Duke Ellington, Irving Mills) – 6:43
 "Nutty" (Thelonious Monk) – 7:30
 "Makin' Whoopee" (Walter Donaldson, Gus Kahn) – 6:26
 "Rosetta" (Earl Hines, Henri Woode) – 5:08

Personnel
Greg Gisbert – trumpet
Clark Terry – trumpet
Al Grey – trombone
Joshua Redman – tenor sax
John Hicks – piano
Ron Carter – bass
Grady Tate – drums

References

John Hicks (jazz pianist) albums
1992 albums
Albums produced by Bob Thiele
Novus Records albums